Gul Mustafa Dev was the first Indian Olympian from the state of Jammu and Kashmir, who represented India in the Winter Olympic Games, with two other participants at the 1988 Winter Olympics held at Calgary, Canada (see India at the 1988 Winter Olympics).

Achievements 
Apart from participating in the Olympics, Gul Dev was among the first to represent team India at the first Asian Winter Games, which were held from 1 to 8 March 1986 in Sapporo, Hokkaidō, Japan. He also went as a national coach for team India to the Junior Asian Winter Games held at China in 2005. He was the Indian team leader for Treofeo Pinocchio Sugli Sci, held in Italy in 2009. He was the Recipient of the Award Of Excellence In Sports for Jammu and Kashmir in 2011.

Alpine skiing results

Olympic results

References

External links
 

Indian male alpine skiers
Olympic alpine skiers of India
Alpine skiers at the 1988 Winter Olympics
Alpine skiers at the 1986 Asian Winter Games
Skiers from Jammu and Kashmir
Alpine skiing coaches
Living people
1963 births